Kokopelli Seed Foundation was created in December 2003 by Dominique Guillet to build a link from Europe's Association Kokopelli to North America, the purpose of Association Kokopelli being to provide access to open-pollinated seeds, as a way to alleviate hunger and promote sustainable food security.

The Seed Foundation has subsequently begun a variety of programs:

 The creation in Mexico in 2005 of a seed-center and seed-school similar to the seed-center Annadana initiated by Association Kokopelli in India.

 Seed workshops in Mexico and Guatemala starting in January 2004, presentation in a conference in Costa Rica on biointensive gardening in October 2004, and more seed workshops in Costa Rica, Mexico, and Guatemala in November 2004.

 “Seeds for Life”, a campaign to donate seeds to Third World countries, inspired by the campaign initiated by Association Kokopelli in France, "Semences sans Frontières," or "Seeds without Borders".

References

External links
 Kokopelli Seed Foundation Homepage

Non-profit organizations based in Boston
Organizations established in 2003
Organizations based in Boston